Edward Timothy Burke (November 5, 1870 – December 25, 1935) was an American judge who served as a justice of the Supreme Court of North Dakota from 1911 to 1916.

Edward Burke was born near Minneapolis, Minnesota. Shortly after his birth, the Burke family moved to Dakota Territory. Burke later attended the University of North Dakota and then after two years transferred to the University of Minnesota, where he received his law degree. He was admitted to the North Dakota Bar and started a practice in Valley City. 

From 1901 to 1905 he served as the state's attorney for Barnes County. He was later elected as judge of the Fifth Judicial District of North Dakota. In 1910, he resigned his position as judge and ran in the general election for a spot on the North Dakota Supreme Court, defeating Justice John Carmody. He served on the North Dakota Supreme Court until he was defeated in the election of 1916.

After losing the election, he practiced law in Bismarck until 1926, when he was appointed a special investigator for the Department of Justice. He served in this role until his death in 1935.

Burke married Florence E. Getchell in 1900. He died on Christmas Day 1935 in Flossmoor, Illinois, at age 65.

See also
List of justices of the North Dakota Supreme Court

References

External links
North Dakota Supreme Court biography

Justices of the North Dakota Supreme Court
North Dakota state court judges
University of Minnesota Law School alumni
1870 births
1935 deaths
North Dakota lawyers
20th-century American judges
People from Valley City, North Dakota
People from Bismarck, North Dakota